Kebon Kelapa is an administrative village in the Gambir district of Indonesia. It has a postal code a 10120.
The village has a population of 11,402 and an area of

See also
 List of administrative villages of Jakarta

Administrative villages in Jakarta
Gambir, Jakarta